Tatta Pani may refer to:

 Tatta Pani, Azad Kashmir, a town and springs of Azad Kashmir
 Tatta Pani, Gilgit Baltistan, a village in Gilgit Baltistan
 Tattapani (Himachal Pradesh), a village in Himachal Pradesh
 Tatta Pani, Kalakote, a town and spring in Jammu and Kashmir